Senator Sieben may refer to:

Katie Sieben (born 1977), Minnesota State Senate
Todd Sieben (born 1945), Illinois State Senate